Anchieta College may refer to:

 Anchieta College (Nova Friburgo), Rio de Janeiro, Brazil
 Anchieta College (Porto Alegre), Rio Grande do Sul, Brazil